The 2017 XIXO Ladies Open Hódmezővásárhely was a professional tennis tournament played on outdoor clay courts. It was the second edition of the tournament and part of the 2017 ITF Women's Circuit, offering a total of $60,000 in prize money. It took place in Hódmezővásárhely, Hungary, from 12–18 June 2017.

Point distribution

Singles main draw entrants

Seeds 

 1 Rankings as of 29 May 2017

Other entrants 
The following players received wildcards into the singles main draw:
  Bianka Békefi
  Olga Danilović
  Marta Kostyuk
  Panna Udvardy

The following player received entry into the singles main draw by a protected ranking:
  Mihaela Buzărnescu

The following players received entry from the qualifying draw:
  Ulrikke Eikeri
  Vivien Juhászová
  Tereza Mihalíková
  Alexandra Panova

Champions

Singles

 Mihaela Buzărnescu def.  Danka Kovinić, 6–2, 6–1

Doubles

 Kotomi Takahata /  Prarthana Thombare def.  Ulrikke Eikeri /  Tereza Mrdeža, 1–0, retired

External links 
 2017 XIXO Ladies Open Hódmezővásárhely at ITFtennis.com
 Official website 

2017 in Hungarian women's sport
2017 ITF Women's Circuit
2017
2017
2017 in Hungarian tennis